Mount Armytage is a dome-shaped mountain, 1,855 m, standing north of Mawson Glacier and 14 nautical miles (26 km) west of Mount Smith in Victoria Land. First charted by the British Antarctic Expedition (1907–09) which named it for Bertram Armytage, a member of the expedition who was in charge of the ponies and led the B.A.E's Western Party.

Mountains of Victoria Land
Scott Coast